The Horseshoe 2 Fire was a 2011 wildfire located along the southeastern flank of the Chiricahua Mountains in southeastern Arizona. It began in Horseshoe Canyon on the Douglas Ranger District of the Coronado National Forest on May 8, 2011, at approximately 11:00 a.m. By June 17, the fire was 65% contained and had become the fifth-largest wildfire in Arizona history.  100% containment was achieved on June 25 after a total area of  had burned.

Post-fire conditions
Regions of the Chiricahua Mountains close to the small commonwealth of Portal are experiencing a slow ecological recovery after the Horseshoe 2 fire burned more than 200,000 acres in 2011. Both the biggest draws to the area are intact, but a lot has changed after the fire swept across the rugged mountains. Additionally, because of a mix of flood harm after the fire and infrequent maintenance, trail conditions have changed quickly, and particularly during monsoon season it is necessary to be careful.

References

External links
 As Arizona Fire Rages, So Does Rumor on Its Origin - New York Times
 Horseshoe Two - InciWeb Incident Information System

2011 wildfires in the United States
Wildfires in Arizona
2011 in Arizona